The 2023 Trofeo Laigueglia was a one-day road cycling race that took place on 1 March 2023 in and around Laigueglia. It was the 60th edition of the Trofeo Laigueglia and was rated as a 1.Pro event as part the 2023 UCI ProSeries.

Teams
Twenty teams were invited to the race. There were ten UCI WorldTour teams, four UCI ProTeams, and six UCI Continental teams. Of the starting peloton of 135 riders, only 35 finished.

UCI WorldTeams

 
 
 
 
 
 
 
 
 
 

UCI ProTeams

 
 
 
 

UCI Continental teams

 
 
 
 Team Colpack–Ballan

Result

References 

Trofeo Laigueglia
Trofeo Laigueglia
2023
Trofeo Laigueglia